The dewberries are a group of species in the genus Rubus, section Rubus, closely related to the blackberries. They are small trailing (rather than upright or high-arching) brambles with aggregate fruits, reminiscent of the raspberry, but are usually purple to black instead of red. Alternatively, they are sometimes referred to as ground berries.

Description
The plants do not have upright canes like some other Rubus species, but have stems that trail along the ground, putting forth new roots along the length of the stem. The stems are covered with fine spines or stickers. Around March and April, the plants start to grow white flowers that develop into small green berries. The tiny green berries grow red and then a deep purple-blue as they ripen. When the berries are ripe, they are tender and difficult to pick in any quantity without squashing them. The berries are sweet and often less seedy than blackberries.

In the winter the leaves often remain on the stems, but may turn dark red.

The European dewberry, Rubus caesius, grows more upright like other brambles. Its fruits are a deep, almost black, purple and are coated with a thin layer or 'dew' of waxy droplets. Thus, they appear sky-blue (caesius being Latin for pale blue). Its fruits are small and retain a markedly tart taste even when fully ripe.

Species 
 Rubus Section Caesii, European dewberry
 European dewberry, Rubus caesius L.
 Rubus Section Flagellares, American dewberries
 Rubus aboriginum  Rydb., synonyms:
 Rubus almus (L.H. Bailey) L.H.Bailey
 Rubus austrinus L.H.Bailey
 Rubus bollianus L.H.Bailey
 Rubus clair-brownii''' L.H.Bailey
 Rubus decor L.H. Bailey
 Rubus flagellaris Willd. var. almus L.H.Bailey
 Rubus foliaceus L.H. Bailey
 Rubus ignarus L.H. Bailey
 Rubus ricei L.H. Bailey
 Aberdeen dewberry, Rubus depavitus  L.H.Bailey
 Northern dewberry, Rubus flagellaris Willd.
 Swamp dewberry, Rubus hispidus L.
 Upland dewberry, Rubus invisus (L.H.Bailey) Britton
 Pacific dewberry, Rubus ursinus Cham. & Schltdl.
 Southern dewberry Rubus trivialis  L.H.Bailey

 Distribution and habitat 
Dewberries are common throughout most of the Northern Hemisphere and are thought of as a beneficial weed. Rubus caesius is frequently restricted to coastal communities, especially sand dune systems.

 Ecology 
The leaves are sometimes eaten by the larvae of some Lepidoptera species including peach blossom moths.

 Uses 
The leaves can be used to make a herbal tea, and the berries are edible and taste sweet. They can be eaten raw, or used to make cobbler, jam, or pie.

In the late 19th and early 20th centuries, the town of Cameron, North Carolina, was known as the "dewberry capital of the world" for large scale cultivation of this berry which was shipped out for widespread consumption. Local growers made extensive use of the railroads in the area to ship them nationally and internationally.

 See also 
 Black raspberry
 Boysenberry, a cross between a dewberry and a loganberry
 Cloudberry, a dioecious Rubus'' species
 Youngberry

References

External links
 

Berries
Plant common names
Rubus